Martin Lewis (born April 28, 1975) is an American former professional basketball player.

Lewis, a 6'5" (1.96 m) and 210 lb (95 kg) small forward, played competitively with Seward County Community College and Butler County Community College (both located in Kansas).

Lewis was selected 50th overall in the 1995 National Basketball Association Draft by the Golden State Warriors and played briefly with the Toronto Raptors from 1996–1997.

External links
NBA stats @ basketballreference.com

1975 births
Living people
American expatriate basketball people in Canada
American men's basketball players
Basketball players from Kansas
Butler Grizzlies men's basketball players
Golden State Warriors draft picks
People from Liberal, Kansas
Small forwards
Toronto Raptors players